A low-water crossing (also known as an Irish bridge or Irish Crossing, causeway in Australia, low-level crossing or low-water bridge) provides a bridge when water flow is low. Under high-flow conditions, water runs over the roadway and precludes vehicular traffic. This approach is cheaper than building a bridge to raise the level of the road above the highest flood stage of a river, particularly in developing countries or in semi-arid areas with rare high-volume rain. Low-water crossings can be dangerous when flooded.

Construction
The low-water crossing was developed from the traditional ford. A ford permits vehicular traffic to cross a waterway with wet wheels. In some countries the term “low-water crossing” implies that the crossing is usually dry, while “ford” implies that the crossing is usually wet.

The simplest type of low water crossing is called an unvented ford or drift. This type of low water crossing is used mainly for shallow waterways or dry streambeds. It consists of an improved surface of gravel, gravel-filled geotextile grid, paving blocks, or concrete slabs positioned to match the slope and elevation of the adjacent waterway and floodplain. 

To cross somewhat deeper waterways, a type of low water crossing called a vented ford can be constructed with culverts. The size of the culverts (often concrete pipes) is usually selected to allow the water to flow below the roadway and provide a dry crossing surface for most of the year. During periods of high water flow (e.g. spring runoff or flash floods), water will flow over the top of the crossing, as the culverts are not large enough to carry these flood-type runoff events.

A more elaborate low-water bridge will usually be an engineered concrete structure. There are thousands of such structures in the arid climates of the western United States; some of them accommodate four-lane city streets or highways. Typically, a low-water bridge that accommodates a high daily volume of vehicular traffic will be underwater only a few days per decade.

Navigation
A low-water bridge renders the waterway non-navigable. In almost all cases this is not a practical concern, since the waterway would be non-navigable except during flood conditions anyway.

A low-water bridge is sometimes called a submersible bridge, but this is a misnomer. A true submersible bridge is used on navigable waterways and is actively lowered into the water.

Safety 
The concept behind low-water crossings is that they are convenient and safe to use in normal conditions. Once the water level rises to the point where it crosses the bridge surface, the bridge is generally unsafe to use due to high current. The force of the moving water may be strong enough to physically push the vehicle off the bridge: the higher the percentage of the vehicle in the water, the more likely the water's force will take the vehicle off the bridge and send it downriver with substantial damage. An additional risk for trying to cross a bridge under water, especially when more than a couple of feet deep, is the possibility of the vehicle's engine stalling. As people will typically try to then get out of the vehicle, they may step into water currents that cause them to fall or be pulled down into the water. As the current during floods is often quite strong, it may sweep them downriver and carry them into debris, possibly causing injury or death.

In developed countries this will usually be indicated by warning signs. An additional hazard is that the bridge surface may become completely obscured by the water, making it relatively easy to fall off the bridge surface into the deeper and more hazardous water on either side. As a consequence, the line of the submerged bridge is often marked with poles or other structures to indicate its course to unwary travelers and emergency users even when submerged.

Despite the obvious dangers and warnings given there are still a significant number of emergencies and even deaths attributable to the unwary use of low-water bridges during flood conditions.

One attempted solution/deterrent is the Stupid Motorist Law in the American state of Arizona. Drivers who become stranded on flooded low-water bridges are charged with the cost incurred by emergency services to come to their rescue.

Fish passage at low-water crossings
Since 1980, the ecological impact of road crossings on natural streams and rivers has been recognised. Baffles may be installed along the culvert to provide some fish-friendly alternative. But baffles can reduce drastically the culvert discharge capacity for a given afflux, thus increasing substantially the total cost of the culvert structure to achieve the same design discharge and afflux, or increasing the risk of road flooding in an existing structure.

See also 
 Floodway
Ford

External links/references 
 Design of Irish bridges, fords and causeways in developing countries
 Low Flow, Mid-Level Stream and Ditch Crossings With Culverts
 Guidelines for Roading and Watercourse Crossings
 List of Fords and Irish Bridges in the UK
Upstream fish passage in box culverts: how do fish and turbulence interplay?  by Dr Hang Wang and Professor Hubert Chanson, School of Civil Engineering, University of Queensland

References

Bridges
Road infrastructure
River crossings
Bridges by structural type